The Broad is a contemporary art museum on Grand Avenue in Downtown Los Angeles. The museum is named for philanthropists Eli and Edythe Broad, who financed the $140 million building that houses the Broad art collections. It offers free general admission to its permanent collection galleries. However, not all of its events are free and admission prices may vary by exhibit and or by event. It opened on September 20, 2015.

History
Since 2008, Eli and Edythe Broad and the Broad Art Foundation had been considering different sites for a museum for the art collection. In November 2008, the news surfaced that Eli Broad had approached Beverly Hills about building his museum at the southeast corner of Wilshire Boulevard and Santa Monica Boulevard. In January 2010, he revealed that he was considering a 10-acre parcel on the campus of West Los Angeles College just outside Culver City. Meanwhile, in March 2010, the Santa Monica City Council approved an agreement in principle to lease the city-owned 2.5-acre parcel next to the Santa Monica Civic Auditorium to Eli Broad for $1 a year for 99 years while also contributing $1 million toward design costs. Broad would have paid the rest, an estimated $50 million to $70 million.

In August 2010, Eli Broad announced formally that he would build a museum in Downtown Los Angeles. He agreed to pay $7.7 million for a 99-year lease. Officially characterized as a grant, the money subsidized affordable-housing units at The Emerson, a high-rise residential tower next to the museum. The agreement also includes an $8.5-million government share of the cost of the museum's outdoor plaza and government payments of up to $30 million to reimburse Broad for building the museum's underground parking garage. Under that buy-back provision, the garage eventually will be government-owned.

In an invited architectural competition for the project in 2010, six architects were asked to present preliminary designs. They included Dutch architect Rem Koolhaas and his firm Office for Metropolitan Architecture; Swiss pair Herzog & de Meuron; Christian de Portzamparc from Paris; Japanese duo Ryue Nishizawa and Kazuyo Sejima of SANAA; and Diller Scofidio + Renfro from New York. Diller Scofidio + Renfro were eventually chosen to design the approximately 120,000-square-foot museum, which includes exhibition space, offices and a parking garage.

In February 2015, Eli and Edythe Broad hosted a public preview of the new building, attracting some 3,500 visitors.

The museum was opened by the Broads on September 20, 2015. Celebrities in attendance included Bill Clinton, Reese Witherspoon, Matthew Perry, Heidi Klum, and Larry King, among others.

Architecture
The Broad is housed in a new building designed by architecture firm Diller Scofidio + Renfro in collaboration with Gensler and structural engineering firm Leslie E. Robertson Associates. Its cost has been estimated at $140 million. With a location adjacent to Frank Gehry's iconic Walt Disney Concert Hall, the museum's design is intended to contrast with its bright metallic perforated exterior while respecting its architectural presence by having a porous, "honeycomblike" exterior. The design is based on a concept entitled "the veil and the vault". "The veil" is a porous envelope that wraps the whole building, filtering and transmitting daylight to the indoor space. This skin is composed of 2,500 rhomboidal panels of fiberglass-reinforced concrete supported by a 650-ton steel substructure. The "vault" is a concrete body which forms the core of the building, dedicated to storage, laboratories, curatorial spaces and offices. The vault is enveloped on all sides by the "veil," an airy, cellular exoskeleton structure that spans across the block-long gallery and provides filtered natural daylight. 

The roof has 318 skylight monitors that admit diffused sunlight from the north. In the non-Euclidean lobby, there is no front desk; instead, visitor-services associates greet guests with mobile devices. Lobby and exhibitions spaces are connected by a 105-foot escalator and a glass-enclosed elevator.

Museum plaza
In early 2014, plans were published for a  public plaza adjacent to The Broad, to be overseen and maintained by the museum as part of its agreement with the city. Designed by the museum's architects, Diller, Scofidio + Renfro, and landscape architect Walter Hood, the plaza, with other streetscape improvements, is estimated to cost $18 million, with about $10 million coming from redevelopment funds and $8 million from the museum. It features a grove of 100-year-old Barouni olive trees.

Construction
The museum's unorthodox facade, which the architects refer to as the "veil", was unusually difficult to fabricate, leading to delays in construction. In a lawsuit filed in Los Angeles County Superior Court in 2014, the museum sued German fabricator Seele GmbH, Zurich American Insurance Company and the Fidelity and Deposit Company of Maryland for $19.8 million in damages for allegedly failing to deliver the facade's components on schedule. The Broad and Seele subsequently agreed to continue work on the museum and to face off later over the dispute.

Collection
The Broad houses a nearly 2,000-piece collection of contemporary art featuring 200 artists, including works by Cindy Sherman, Jeff Koons, Ed Ruscha, Roy Lichtenstein and Andy Warhol, including a 1963 "Single Elvis" by the latter. The museum suggested in 2015 that it was acquiring the "Single Elvis", which sent the prices of pop art to unprecedented levels.

Other notable installations include Yayoi Kusama's Infinity Mirrored Room – The Souls of Millions of Light Years Away (2013), Ragnar Kjartansson's expansive nine-screen video The Visitors (2012), Julie Mehretu's 24-feet-wide canvas Beloved (Cairo) (2013), and Goshka Macuga's photo-tapestry Death of Marxism, Women of All Lands Unite (2013). The museum also owns the largest collection of Cindy Sherman works worldwide, with 129 pieces.

The collection has been described by the Washington Post as including too much "high-end trash" but "even though the bad overwhelms the great, there are great works throughout."

The building will also serve as headquarters for the Broad Art Foundation's lending library of contemporary works.

Exhibitions
The Broad's inaugural exhibition is to feature a selection of more than 250 paintings, sculptures and photographs by more than 60 artists drawn exclusively from the permanent collection, including John Ahearn, El Anatsui, Richard Artschwager, John Baldessari, Jean-Michel Basquiat, Bernd and Hilla Becher, Joseph Beuys, Mark Bradford, Chris Burden, Chuck Close, John Currin, Eric Fischl, Jack Goldstein, Mark Grotjahn, Keith Haring, Damien Hirst, Jasper Johns, Mike Kelley, Ellsworth Kelly (four paintings), William Kentridge, Anselm Kiefer, Ragnar Kjartansson, Jeff Koons, Barbara Kruger, Yayoi Kusama, Sherrie Levine, Roy Lichtenstein (10 paintings), Glenn Ligon, Sharon Lockhart, Robert Longo, Goshka Macuga, Julie Mehretu, Takashi Murakami, Lari Pittman, Richard Prince, Neo Rauch, Robert Rauschenberg, Charles Ray, Ed Ruscha, Julian Schnabel, Cindy Sherman, Mark Tansey, Robert Therrien, Cy Twombly, Kara Walker, Jeff Wall, Andy Warhol (11 paintings), David Wojnarowicz and Christopher Wool.

Restaurant
The museum includes a free-standing restaurant on its plaza, Otium – Latin for "leisure time" – which Eli Broad developed with Bill Chait of République and Bestia restaurants. It features Timothy Hollingsworth, a former head chef of The French Laundry in Napa Valley, as executive chef. In September 2015, Isolated Elements, 2015, a photographic mural by the artist Damien Hirst was installed on the south facade of the restaurant; it measures nearly 84 feet by 32 feet and is based on Hirst's 1991 sculpture Isolated Elements Swimming in the Same Direction for the Purpose of Understanding, a wall-mounted cabinet filled with fish preserved in formaldehyde.

Management

Funding
As of 2014, The Broad's endowment is at $200 million, thereby larger than any museum in Los Angeles except for the Getty Museum. The overall annual budget is $16 million, which is provided for through established funds. The museum offers mostly free admission to the public, but will charge for temporary special exhibitions.

Governance
Besides Eli and Edythe Broad, the Broad's Board of Governance also includes art dealer Irving Blum, Los Angeles Philharmonic CEO Deborah Borda, restaurateur Michael Chow, businessman Bruce Karatz, and former ambassador Robert H. Tuttle, among others.

The museum's director is art historian Joanne Heyler.

Attendance
In its first year, The Broad attracted 753,000 visitors, roughly equivalent to the 2011 attendance at Los Angeles County Museum of Art (LACMA). In 2019, more than 900,000 people visited.

References

External links

Broad Art Foundation

 
2010s architecture in the United States
2015 establishments in California
Art museums and galleries in Los Angeles
Art museums established in 2015
Buildings and structures in Downtown Los Angeles
Bunker Hill, Los Angeles
Diller Scofidio + Renfro buildings
Landmarks in Los Angeles
Modern art museums in the United States
Neo-futurism architecture